New Centre or New Center may refer to:

New Centre, a centre-right political party in France.
New Centre (Andorra), a former political party in Andorra.
New Center, Detroit, a neighborhood in Detroit, Michigan, United States.
New Centre, Gauteng, a suburb of Johannesburg, South Africa.
New Centre (Latvia), a centre-left political party in Latvia.

See also
New Centre-Right, political party in Italy